John Littler may refer to:
 Sir John Hunter Littler, officer of the East India Company's Bengal Army
 John Littler (cricketer), English cricketer